Sultan is an Islamic title of authority.

Sultan may also refer to:

People
 Sultan (name), including lists of people with the given name and surname
 Rikishi (wrestler), a Samoan-American wrestler who goes by the ring name "The Sultan"

Places
Sultan, Ontario, Canada, an unincorporated community
Sultan, Libya, a town
Sultan, County Tyrone, a townland in County Tyrone, Northern Ireland
Sultan, Bolu, Turkey, a village
Sultan, Edirne, Turkey, a town
Sultan Mountains, Turkey
Sultan, Washington, United States, a city
Sultan River, Washington
Sultan Glacier, Elephant Island, Antarctica

Animals
Sultan (chimpanzee), a chimpanzee and test subject of Wolfgang Köhler
Sultan (horse), a racehorse born in 1816
Sultan chicken, a breed of Turkish chicken

Fictional characters
 The Sultan (Disney), a fictional character in Disney's Aladdin franchise
 Sultan (comics), a fictional character in the Marvel comics

Films and television
Sultan (1999 film), a Telugu film
Sultan (2008 film), a Malayalam film
Sultan (2016 film), a Hindi film
Sulthan (2021 film), a Tamil film

Military
, several Royal Navy ships
FV105 Sultan, a British Army command and control vehicle

Music
Sultan Records, a short-lived jazz label c. 1946
Sultans (band), an American rock and roll band (2000-2007)
Sultans (EP), the introductory EP by the San Diego, California rock and roll band Sultans
Les Sultans, French Canadian music band
Sultan (hip hop artist), mononym for a French hip hop artist
Sultan (producer), part of the Canadian producing, songwriting and mixing duo Sultan & Ned Shepard

Sports and games
Boğaziçi Sultans, Turkey's first American football team
Hyderabad Sultans, an Indian professional field hockey team
Multan Sultans, a Pakistan Super League team based in Multan, Pakistan
Sultan (solitaire), a card game

Transportation
Sultan Air, a Turkish charter airline that operated from 1989 to 1993
Sultan, a GWR Iron Duke Class steam locomotive run on the Great Western Railway
Sultan, one of the GWR 3031 Class locomotives that were built for and run on the Great Western Railway between 1891 and 1915

See also
Sultana (disambiguation)
Suratrana, Sanskrit transcription of Sultan
Old Sultan, a German fairy tale collected by the Brothers Grimm